Haldia Industrial Belt or Haldia Industrial Zone   is an industrial area established in  Eastern Midnapore district , West Bengal, India. This industrial area is housed in the center of Haldia port. The main industrial center of this industrial city is Petrochemicals. Industrial area is developed with more than 350 sq km area of Haldia sub-division.

Location 

Haldia Industrial Zone is formed by river on three sides. The Rupnarayan river and Hooghly river in the north, the Hooghly river on the east and the Haldi river on the south. The industrial area is 40 km away from the Bay of Bengal by Hooghly river. The industrial area is 10 meters high from the sea level.

See also
Hooghly Industrial Belt

References 

Haldia
Economy of West Bengal